Barrie—Innisfil is a federal electoral district in Ontario. It encompasses a portion of Ontario previously included in the electoral districts of Barrie and York—Simcoe.

History

Barrie—Innisfil was created by the 2012 federal electoral boundaries redistribution and was legally defined in the 2013 representation order. It came into effect upon the call of the 42nd Canadian federal election, scheduled for October 2015.

Members of Parliament

This riding has elected the following Members of Parliament:

Geography

Barrie—Innisfil consists of:

(a) that part of the County of Simcoe comprising the Town of Innisfil; and

(b) that part of the City of Barrie lying southerly of a line described as follows: commencing at the intersection of the westerly limit of said city with Dunlop Street West; thence northeasterly along said street to Tiffin Street; thence southeasterly and easterly along said street to Lakeshore Drive; thence northeasterly in a straight line to the easterly limit of said city (at the intersection of the southerly limit of the Township of Oro-Medonte with the northerly limit of the Town of Innisfil).

Riding associations

Riding associations are the local branches of the national political parties:

Election results

References

Ontario federal electoral districts
Politics of Barrie
2013 establishments in Ontario